Walter Ader Hausman (7 November 1912 – unknown) was a Czech origin Chilean chess player, Chilean Chess Championship winner (1966).

Biography
Walter Ader Hausman was born as Walter Ader in South Moravian Region. In 1938 he won the championship of the Central Society of Czech Chess Players. After the German occupation of Czechoslovakia in the same year he moved to Chile and changed last name to Walter Ader Hausman. In 1966 Walter Ader Hausman won the Chilean Chess Championship. He participated in a significant number of international chess tournaments held in South America. Walter Ader Hausman twice participated in Pan American Chess Championship: in 1958 in Bogota he ranked in 10th place, and in 1968 in Cárdenas he shared 6th–7th place.

Walter Ader Hausman played for Chile in the Chess Olympiads:
 In 1956, at third board in the 12th Chess Olympiad in Moscow (+6, =5, -5),
 In 1960, at third board in the 14th Chess Olympiad in Leipzig (+7, =5, -4),
 In 1964, at second board in the 16th Chess Olympiad in Tel Aviv (+2, =6, -8).

Walter Ader Hausman was the publisher and editor-in-chief of the chess magazine Jaque Mate. The year of his death is unknown.

References

External links

Walter Ader Hausman chess games at 365chess.com

1912 births
Year of death missing
People from Hodonín
Czechoslovak chess players
Chilean chess players
Chess Olympiad competitors
20th-century chess players
Czechoslovak emigrants to Chile